Palicus is a genus of stilt crabs in the family Palicidae.

Species
Twenty-two species are included in the genus :

Palicus acutifrons (A. Milne-Edwards, 1880)
Palicus affinis (A. Milne-Edwards & Bouvier, 1880)
Palicus alternatus Rathbun, 1897
Palicus angustus Rathbun, 1897
Palicus bahamensis Rathbun, 1897
Palicus caronii (Roux, 1828)
Palicus cristatipes (A. Milne-Edwards, 1880)
Palicus cortezi (Crane, 1937)
Palicus cursor (A. Milne-Edwards, 1880)
Palicus dentatus (A. Milne-Edwards, 1880)
Palicus depressus Rathbun, 1897
Palicus faxoni Rathbun, 1897
Palicus fragilis (Rathbun, 1894)
Palicus gracilipes (A. Milne-Edwards, 1880)
Palicus gracilis (Smith, 1883)
Palicus isthmia Rathbun, 1897
Palicus lucasii Rathbun, 1898
Palicus obesus (A. Milne-Edwards, 1880)
Palicus sicus (A. Milne-Edwards, 1880)
Palicus tuberculata (Faxon, 1893)
Palicus velerae (Garth, 1939)
Palicus zonatus (Rathbun, 1894)

References

Crabs